Debeerius is a genus of chondrichthyan from the Mississippian age Bear Gulch Limestone of Montana, United States. It is named after Gavin de Beer. One species, D. ellefseni, is known.

References 

Prehistoric cartilaginous fish genera
Mississippian fish
Fossil taxa described in 2000
Mississippian fish of North America